Live in Seattle is the first live album by singer/songwriter Shawn McDonald on Sparrow Records.

Track listing
 Here I Am – 5:16
 Take My Hand – 3:57
 All I Need – 3:30
 Open Me – 5:39
 Hold On – 8:10
 Have You Ever? – 4:39
 Perfectly Done – 3:38
 Without You – 5:05
 Home – 3:54
 Beautiful – 4:59
 Gravity – 3:58
 Over the Rainbow – 3:32

Album credits
 Produced and Mixed by Christopher Stevens
 Executive Producer: Christopher York
 Recording Engineer: Angrew Gregg
 Remote Recording: The Phantom Center, Inc.
 Mastered by Jim DeMain at Yes Master
 Mars Hill Church Venue Director: Bubba Jennings
 Acoustic Guitar,  Lead Vocals: Shawn McDonald
 Acoustic Guitar, Cello: Neal Vickers
 Background Vocals: Cara Flory
 Addition Musician: Matt Slocum
 All Songs Written by Shawn McDonald
 Except "Take Me Hand" Written by Shawn McDonald and Paul Wright
 "Hold On" and "Gravity" Written by Shawn McDonald and Christopher Stevens
 "Over the Rainbow" Written by E.Y. Harburg and Harold Arlen
 Art Direction: Tim Frank
 Graphic Design: Denny Schmickle
 Photography: Joel Flory

Shawn McDonald albums
2005 live albums
Sparrow Records live albums